(born January 11, 1980 in Ube, Yamaguchi) is a Japanese pop singer who debuted in 2001 with the then six-member vocal and dance group, Exile, as their vocalist under the name, Shun. In 2004, he participated in the tribute album for Yutaka Ozaki (尾崎豊) under his full name Shunsuke Kiyokiba as a solo artist. On January 19, 2005, his solo debut single "Itsuka..." (いつか…) was released.  After four-and-a-half years with Exile, in March 2006, Kiyokiba announced his withdrawal from the group to focus on his solo career as a rock artist.

In July 2011, he recorded the duet "I Believe" with South Korean singer Shin Hye-sung of Shinhwa.

Biography

Background 
According to his official website, Kiyokiba has played in a band since he was in middle school.  Even after the band broke up when he was 18, he still played the guitar in the tunnels in his hometown, alongside others who shared the same interest.  By the age of 20, he has worked in the construction business, and has managed a team of teen workers in the field.  Then, he participated in a vocal audition organized by a local television station and won.  Later, he was signed by the record company, and was brought to Tokyo as one of EXILE's vocalists.

Music career highlights 
 September 27, 2001 – debuted as EXILE's vocalist, SHUN
 March 24, 2004 – took part in Yutaka Ozaki's tribute album, officially beginning his solo career as Shunsuke Kiyokiba
 January 19, 2005 – released solo debut single "Itsuka...".
 October 19, 2005 – released solo debut album under solo name "Kiyokiba Shunsuke".
 March 27, 2006 – announced withdrawal from EXILE, effective March 29, 2006
 October 21 – December 11, 2006 – performed first nationwide solo live tour
 March 28, 2007 – released nationwide live tour DVD
 September 17, 2008 – announced leave from LDH and Avex Record Label
 January 11, 2009 – announced on his birthday and last Tour day of Rock&SoulII that he's now signed with Victor Entertainment's Speedstar Records.
 March 18, 2009 – released his last album "SONGS 2005–2008" with Avex Rhythm Zone.
 July 8, 2009 – released first album "Rockin' the Door" with Victor Entertainment's Speedstar Records.
 September 2, 2009 – released first single "JET" with Victor Entertainment's Speedstar Records.
 September 30, 2009 – released second album "FLYING JET" with Victor Entertainment's Speedstar Records.
 May 5, 2010 – released his live DVD: "Otoko Matsuri 2009 Uijin −2009.11.20 Akasaka Blitz-"
 September 29, 2010 – released second single "Mahou no Kotoba" with Victor Entertainment's Speedstar Records.
 October 27, 2010 – released third single "Yale" with Victor Entertainment's Speedstar Records. And he released his mini album in rental edition "Ballad Selection"
 November 24, 2010 – release third album "ROCK & SOUL" with Victor Entertainment's Speedstar Records.
 May 25, 2011 – released his live video "Documentary Music Video Ube Sanbusaku Kanzen Ban"
 June 29, 2011 – released live album "ROCK & SOUL 2010–2011 LIVE"
 July 27, 2011 – released his live video "Nippon Budokan −2011.4.24 ROCK & SOUL 2010–2011 TOUR FINAL-"
 November 23, 2011 – released first cover single "Sakura Iro Mau koro / Melody" with Victor Entertainment's Speedstar Records.
 December 7, 2011 – released his fourth album "LOVE SONGS ~BALLAD SELECTION~". Also released his 2nd live album "ROLLING MY WAY −2011.9.30 at Zepp Sendai-" under Victor Entertainment's Speedstar Records.
 August 29, 2012 – released fourth single "Fighting Man" with Victor Entertainment's Speedstar Records.
 November 28, 2012 – released fifth single "again" with Victor Entertainment's Speedstar Records.
 February 6, 2013 – released fifth album "FIGHTING MEN" with Victor Entertainment's Speedstar Records.
 November 2, 2013 – released his limited edition single "Honey"
 December 17, 2013 – released his live album DVD "ROCK&SOUL 2013 "FIGHTING MEN" TOUR FINAL 2013.7.13 at Osakajo Hall.
 May 21, 2014 – released sixth single "Shiawase na Hibi wo Kimi to" with Victor Entertainment's Speedstar Records.
 July 23, 2014 – released seventh single "Rock Star" with Victor Entertainment's Speedstar Records.
 September 10, 2014 – released sixth album "MY SOUNDS" with Victor Entertainment's Speedstar Records.
 June 24, 2015 – released eighth single "Kiseki" with Victor Entertainment's Speedstar Records.
 August 19, 2015 – released ninth single "Kagerou" with Victor Entertainment's Speedstar Records.
 February 8, 2017 – released tenth single "Tomo e" with Victor Entertainment's Speedstar Records.
 March 29, 2017 – released seventh album "REBORN" with Victor Entertainment's Speedstar Records.

Other highlights 
 May 14 – June 19, 2004 and September 17 – December 5, 2005 – held two solo exhibitions of poetry, calligraphy, and photography, in Fukuoka, Osaka, Tokyo, and Sapporo, drawing 32000 attendees.
 February 10, 2007 – debuted as an actor in the motion picture, Tengoku wa mattekureru (天国は待ってくれる), alongside Yoshihiko Inohara (井ノ原快彦) from V6 and Aya Okamoto (岡本綾).  It has reached No. 9 on Japan's box-office ranking during its first week of release.

Special terminologies

Eno hundert elf
In spring 2007, Kiyokiba has begun his new brand of clothing line under this name, which came from the number "111" in German.  This number is linked to his birthday, January 11, which can sometimes be abbreviated as "0111" or "111".

Kiyokibasstars
On April 26, 2006, Kiyokiba launched KIYOKIBASSTARS, his official bass fishing website, promoting his hobby of topwater style fishing.  There are four official members in his Kiyokibasstars fishing group.  His fishing trips to Lake El Salto in Mexico and Lake Castaic in California have been filmed and officially released into DVDs.

Utaiya
Kiyokiba often referred to himself as "utaiya" (唄い屋).  It is a label found on the back of his CDs and in video footage of his DVDs.  In February 2007, the website UTAIYA.COM was launched, which stated:

UTAIYA is the persons who sing a song with all our heart and soul.

It is a website which promotes the new artists, Raine Kawane (川根来音) and Shouta Nishihiro (西広しょうた).

Discography

Singles

Albums

DVD

Other releases

References

External links 
 kiyokiba.net – Official site 
 KIYOKIBASSTARS – Kiyokiba's official bass fishing site 
 映画 『天国は待ってくれる』 公式サイト – Tengoku wa mattekureru official site 
 UTAIYA OFFICIAL WEBSITE – Artists under Kiyokiba's Utaiya label 
 ENO HUNDERT ELF – Official site of Kiyokiba's clothing line 
 KiyokibaCh – Official Kiyokiba YouTube channel 
 J!-ENT Special Feature: Kiyokiba Shunsuke – J!-ENT's feature article on Kiyokiba Shunsuke 

Japanese male singer-songwriters
Japanese singer-songwriters
Avex Group artists
Living people
1980 births
Musicians from Yamaguchi Prefecture
21st-century Japanese singers
21st-century Japanese male singers